Jon Aston (born 5 June 1976) is an English-born professional rugby league footballer who played in the 1990s and 2000s.

Background
Jon Aston was born in Newport, Isle of Wight.

International honours
Jon Aston won caps for Wales while at Hull Kingston Rovers 2003 1-cap + 1-cap (interchange/substitute).

References

External links
 (archived by web.archive.org) Stats – Past Players – A at hullfc.com
 (archived by web.archive.org) Statistics at hullfc.com

1976 births
Living people
English rugby league players
English people of Welsh descent
Hull F.C. players
Hull Kingston Rovers players
People from Newport, Isle of Wight
Rochdale Hornets players
Rugby league players from Hampshire
Rugby league props
Rugby league second-rows
Sheffield Eagles players
Wales national rugby league team players